Maharashtra Industrial Development Corporation (MIDC) is a project of the government of Maharashtra state in India and is the leading corporation of Maharashtra. It provides businesses with infrastructure such as land (open plot or built-up spaces), roads, water supply, drainage facilities and street lights. Dr. P. Anbalagan, IAS, is the CEO of MIDC Maharashtra Industrial Development Corporation.

History
After the formation of Maharashtra state on 1 May 1960, the government of Maharashtra constituted a "Board of Industrial Development" (BID) on 1 October 1960, under the chairmanship of Shri. S. G. Barve, I.C.S. The committees recommendations received in the industries department were taken up for implementation. As per the Borkar Committee's recommendations, development of Ulhas Valley Water Supply was entrusted to the Board of Industrial Development (BID). The BID framed the legislation; it was introduced before the state legislation and passed in the form of "Maharashtra Industrial Development Act" which gave birth to MIDC, as a separate corporation on 1 August 1962. A small ceremony at Wagle estate, Thane, under the chairmanship of the Chief Minister Yashwantrao Balwantrao Chavan.

The key historical policy decisions taken by MIDC changed the socioeconomic scenario of the state as its activities spread in the interior. The important policy decision of setting up "independent filtered, potable water supply system of adequate capacity" as essential infrastructure for industrial development was the most intelligent step taken by MIDC in the beginning. It stabilised the population base near the industrial areas. The simultaneously strategic decision taken to provide water supply to nearby population from the capabilities created by MIDC of their own water supply system resulted in phenomenal urban growth in the nearby small towns and villages. The growth of Kalyan complex and Pimpri-Chinchwad are results of this key policy decision taken by MIDC.

Up to date 233 industrial areas are developed by MIDC in Maharashtra on 53120 hectors. With the experience of 45 years, MIDC observed that certain industries are required to be provided some specialized facilities. For the growth of industries and specialized parks/industrial clusters are developed with specialized infrastructure facilities. In this way IT & BT Parks, Wine Parks, Textile Parks, Chemical Zones, Food Parks, Leather Park, Floriculture Park and Electronic Zone etc. are developed by the MIDC.

Considering the international standard facilities required to attract multinational companies, five-star industrial areas are developed by MIDC at nine locations in Maharashtra. Considering the export potential of the products delineated duty-free,  which is to be deemed to be foreign territory for the purpose of trade operations and duties and traffics, special economic zones are being developed by MIDC to provide hassle free environment for exporters. Maharashtra got overwhelming 74 Special Economic Zone approvals from the government of India which is in first position compare to other states in India.

The planned and systematic industrial development in the State of Maharashtra has continuously placed Maharashtra in first position in India for the highest productivity, economics performance, business efficiency, government efficiency, infrastructures and overall competitiveness. As per the World Competitiveness Report 2006, Maharashtra ranked 37, ahead of South Korea, South Africa, Philippines, Greece, Brazil, Italy, Russia and Indonesia.
	
In the state, MIDC has demarcated 57,650 plots and allotted 48,701 plots to entrepreneurs. There are 28918 industries in production. MIDC has provided the water supply scheme 2240.83 MLD capacity and water consumption is 1314.73 MLD in the MIDC areas in the state. MIDC has provided water supply pipelines of 3238.60 km to cater the demand of the industries in Maharashtra. The annual revenue generated from the water supply is Rs.432.00 crores. 2422.82 km of roads are constructed by MIDC for providing good quality approach to the industries.  The development expenditure of Rs.3096.75 crores is incurred for the infrastructure works by MIDC.

Achievements
Developed specialized parks for different industrial sectors, including IT, BT, wine (grape processing) Park, Silver Zone, gems and jewellery, textiles, leather, chemical industry, electronics, food processing, foundry,  floriculture etc.
Elaborate network of industrial & domestic water supply, total quantity supplied 1285 MLD.

See also
Make In Maharashtra

References

External links
 MIDC's website
 Government Of Maharashtra
 MIDC Land Rates

Economy of Maharashtra
State industrial development corporations of India
State agencies of Maharashtra
Companies based in Mumbai
Indian companies established in 1962
1962 establishments in Maharashtra